Jeison Andrés Angulo Trujillo (born 27 June 1996) is a Colombian professional footballer who plays as a defender for Atlético Junior. He was champion of Categoría Primera A with Deportivo Cali in 2015.

Honours

Club
Deportivo Cali
 Categoría Primera A: 2015-I
 Superliga Colombiana: 2014

References

1996 births
Living people
Colombian footballers
Colombian expatriate footballers
Colombia under-20 international footballers
Colombia youth international footballers
Categoría Primera A players
Liga MX players
Deportivo Cali footballers
Cortuluá footballers
Club Universidad Nacional footballers
Atlético Junior footballers
Association football defenders
Footballers from Cali
Colombian expatriate sportspeople in Mexico
Expatriate footballers in Mexico